Harold "Hal" Eidsvig (February 26, 1915 – December 1, 1959) was a Canadian professional golfer who captured two Manitoba Amateur championships and four Manitoba Open titles in less than a decade.
 
Eidsvig was inducted into the Manitoba Sports Hall of Fame and Museum in 2004.

Tournament wins
1946 Manitoba Amateur
1947 Manitoba Amateur, Manitoba Open
1949 Manitoba Open
1952 Manitoba Open
1955 Manitoba Open

Achievements and awards 
 Inducted into the Manitoba Sports Hall of Fame and Museum in 2004.
 Inducted into the Manitoba Golf Hall of Fame in 2015.
 Low amateur trophy for Manitoba Open named after him.

References
Manitoba Sports Hall of Fame
Manitoba Golf Hall of Fame
Harold Eidsvig Memorial Trophy
Doreen Eidsvig Obit

Canadian male golfers
Golfing people from Manitoba
1915 births
1959 deaths